Senkyu (戦球), known as Battle Balls in English, is an arcade puzzle game created by Seibu Kaihatsu and released in 1995.  A version for the Sony PlayStation was later released in limited quantities for the Japanese market and is now extremely rare.  A demo version of the game was also included in the PlayStation release of Raiden DX.

Gameplay

The game consists of three colored balls that can be rotated clockwise or anti-clockwise falling from the top of the screen.  When they collect with four or more like-colored balls on the pile at the bottom of the screen they disappear and the surrounding balls fall to fill in the space.  Bonus points are awarded for completing combos, chain-reactions caused by the falling balls.  The game ends when the pile reaches the top of the screen.

Game modes

The game features Single player, Puzzle, Vs. CPU, and Vs. Player modes.

Reception 

In Japan, Game Machine listed Senkyu on their December 1, 1995 issue as being the ninth most-successful arcade game of the month.

Sequels

In 2001, Seibu Kaihatsu released two new versions of Senkyu named Gravure Collection and Pakkun Ball TV respectively.  Both are strictly single player games and feature live-action video clips.  The gameplay remains the same, but the background is a display of a static video image.  When balls are matched and disappear the background video is advanced.  A timer counts down the length until the end of the level and once a level is completed the player is rewarded with a short video before the next level begins.

References

External links

 Senkyu at nfggames.com
 Senkyu at Arcade-History.com
 Gravure Collection at Arcade-History.com

1995 video games
Arcade video games
PlayStation (console) games
Seibu Kaihatsu games
Video games developed in Japan